"The War We Made" is the fifth single by the American Christian rock band Red on their album Declaration.

Themes and composition
Regarding the song's meaning, Anthony Armstrong said it "talks about our innate ability as humans to cause destruction in our own lives. A lot of the time, we don't even realize that we ourselves are the source of the pain. And if we want to see a change brought about, it's a fight that we have to be willing to win."

Reception
Chad Childers and Jake Richardson of Loudwire called the song one of the best of 2020, saying "The song is a soaring piece, building in intensity to the chorus until Michael Barnes delivers the power vocal that expresses the angst at its height."

Charts

References

Red (American band) songs
2020 songs
Songs written by Rob Graves
Christian metal songs